Józef Feliks Gawlina, born in 1892 in Strzybnik (Racibórz County) in Silesia - died 1964 in Rome was a Divisional general in the Polish Armed Forces. He was an ordained priest, Doctor of Theology and from 1933, Catholic bishop in the Military Ordinariate of Poland. After the Second world war, cardinal Hlond gave him the brief to provide pastoral care to the Polish diaspora. In the words of Pope John Paul II, Gawlina was a "bishop - Nomad". He was raised to the rank of Archbishop in 1957. Following his death, the Secretary General of the Second Vatican Council described him as a "real pastor".

References

Bibliography

 A. K. Kunert, ed. (2002)."Józef Feliks Gawlina Biskup Polowy Polskich Sił Zbrojnych" in Emigracyjna Rzeczpospolita 1939-1990, vol. III. Warsaw.
 Władysław Bochnak, W służbie Bogu i ludziom. Sylwetki Ślązaków, Marki-Struga 1989, p. 200-211.
 T. Kryska Karski i S. Żurakowski, Generałowie Polski Niepodległej publ. Editions Spotkania Warszawa 1991
 Henryk P. Kosk, Generalicja polska, publ. Oficyna wydawnicza "Ajaks", Pruszków: 1998.
 Henryka Wolna-Van Das, Biskup polowy Józef Gawlina – w 100 lecie urodzin, Polska Zbrojna, November 1992

External links
 Nota biograficzna Józefa Gawliny na stronie Ordynariatu Polowego Wojska Polskiego [access: 2011-12-25]
 

1892 births
1964 deaths
20th-century Roman Catholic archbishops in Poland
Participants in the Second Vatican Council